Weekends of Sound is the third full-length studio album by the indie rock band 764-Hero. It was released in 2000 on Up Records.

Critical reception
The Stranger wrote that "throughout this outstanding record, tension coolly builds and unravels, insinuating what's to come." Phoenix New Times thought that "the distinctly new production aesthetic shines through in the thumps and clashes of Johnson's intricate drum patterns, in the meandering tangents of Bertram's bass lines and in the subdued tinkling of Atkins' guitar notes."

Track listing

Personnel
John Atkins - guitar
James Bertram - bass
Polly Johnson - drums

References

2000 albums
764-HERO albums
Up Records albums